Hot Property may refer to:
 Hot Property (British TV series), a 1997–1998 property show
 Hot Property (Australian TV series), a 1999–2013 real estate show
 Hot Property (album), a 1979 album by Heatwave
 Hot Property (film), a 2016 British comedy film